Emanuel Hatzofe (1928 – 19 July 2019) was an Israeli sculptor.

Emanuel Hatzofe was born in Tel Aviv. Before the establishment of the State, Hatzofe joined the Palmach. He was wounded in the 1947–1949 Palestine war. He studied at the Bezalel Academy of Art and Design in Jerusalem from 1946 to 1947 and then pursued advanced studies with sculptor Ben Zvi. He joined the Merchant Marine and became a sea captain.

Hatzofe received first prize at the 1995 Toyamura International Sculpture Biennale in Hokkaidō, Japan.

Hatzofe died on 19 July 2019, aged 90.

Works
Hatzofe's public sculptures include:
 Holocaust and Heroism, 1990, Tel Aviv University
 The Throne, 1991, Tel Aviv University
 Anchor, 1993, Ra'anana, Israel
 Boat, 2003, Tel Aviv Museum of Art

See also
Visual arts in Israel

References

External links 
 Emmanuel Hatzofe  Blog
 The Israel Museum Jerusalem

1928 births
2019 deaths
Jewish sculptors
Israeli sculptors
Modern sculptors
Bezalel Academy of Arts and Design alumni